The 1893 Birthday Honours were appointments by Queen Victoria to various orders and honours to reward and highlight good works by citizens of the British Empire. The appointments were made to celebrate the official birthday of The Queen, and were published in the London Gazette on 2 June 1893 and in The Times on 3 June 1893.

The recipients of honours are displayed here as they were styled before their new honour, and arranged by honour, with classes (Knight, Knight Grand Cross, etc.) and then divisions (Military, Civil, etc.) as appropriate.

United Kingdom and British Empire

Baron
Sir H. Hussey Vivian 
Sir Thomas Henry Farrer 
John Campbell White, of Overtoun, Dumbartonshire.
Cecil G. Savile Foljambe.
Francis Douglas, Viscount Drumlanrig.

Baronetcies
Isaac Holden  
James Joicey 
Dr. Charles Cameron 
Benjamin Hingley 
William Ingram 
Joseph Pulley, formerly Member of Parliament for Herefordshire.
William Henry Wills, formerly Member of Parliament for Coventry.
Walter Gilbey.
Sir Robert Hart  Inspector-General of Customs in China.

Knight Bachelor
William Roger Brown, of Trowbridge.
William Davies, formerly Member of Parliament for Pembrokeshire.
Henry Dias, late Puisne Judge of the Supreme Court of the Island of Ceylon.
William Henderson, of Aberdeen.
Samuel George Johnson, Town Clerk of Nottingham.
John Leng  for Dundee.
George Henry Lewis.
John Madden, Chief Justice of the Supreme Court of the Colony of Victoria.
Patteson Nickalls.
Dr. George Augustus Pilkington, formerly Mayor of Southport.
Francis Powell, President of the Royal Scottish Society of Painters in Watercolour.
Dr. William Overend Priestley.
Hugh Gilzean-Reid, First President of the Institute of Journalists.
Dr. Benjamin Ward Richardson 
John Richard Robinson, Editor of the Daily News.
Edward Richard Russell, Editor of the Liverpool Daily Post.
George Shenton, President of the Legislative Council of the Colony of Western Australia.
Samuel Henry Strong, Chief Justice of the Supreme Court of the Dominion of Canada.
John Tenniel.
Thomas Wright, of Leicester.

The Most Honourable Order of the Bath

Knight Grand Cross of the Order of the Bath (GCB)
Military Division
Lieutenant-General Sir James Hills-Johnes  Royal (late Bengal) Artillery.
General Sir William Montagu Scott McMurdo 
General Lord Mark Ralph George Kerr

Knight Commander of the Order of the Bath (KCB)
Military Division
General Richard Thomas Farren  
Major-General and Honorary Lieutenant-General William Drysdale  
Lieutenant-General and Honorary General Julius Augustus Robert Raines  
General William Gordon Cameron  Commanding the Troops in South Africa.
General the Hon. Percy Robert Basil Feilding  
General Alfred William Lucas  Indian Staff Corps.
Major-General and Honorary Lieutenant-General John Blick Spurgin 
General Thomas Wright  Indian Staff Corps.
Lieutenant-General John Doran  Indian Staff Corps. 
General Robert White   
General Mark Walker 
Lieutenant-General and Honorary General Charles John Foster  
Lieutenant-General William Stirling  Royal Artillery, Governor and Commandant Royal Military Academy.

Civil Division
Andrew Noble  late Capt. Royal Artillery.
Francis Mowatt  Assistant Secretary to the Treasury.
John Frecheville Dykes Donnelly  Honorary Major-General Royal Engineers (Retired List), Secretary to the Science and Art Department.

Companion of the Order of the Bath (CB)
Military Division
Major-General Augustus Henry King, Royal Artillery, Commanding Royal Artillery, Aldershot.
Major-General Henry Broom Feilden.
Major-General Archibald Hammond Utterson, Commanding a Brigade at Aldershot.
Major General Crombie Cowie, Royal (late. Bengal) Artillery.
Major-General George Francis Seville, Indian Staff Corps, Commanding a Second Class District in India.
Colonel James May, Indian Army.
Colonel William Liston Dalrymple, Deputy Quartermaster-General in India.
Lieutenant-Colonel and Colonel Thomas Thomson Simpson.
Colonel Arthur Haldimand Prinsep, Indian Army, Colonel on the Staff, Bengal.
Colonel Charles John Burnett, Assistant Adjutant-General, Aldershot.
Lieutenant-Colonel and Colonel Arthur Gore Handcock, Indian Staff Corps, Colonel on the Staff, Bengal.
Lieutenant-Colonel and Colonel Dawsonne Melancthon Strong, Indian Army.
Colonel (with the local rank of Brigadier-General) Alexander Angus Airlie Kinloch, Commanding a Second Class District in India.
Lieutenant-Colonel and Colonel Malcolm Hassels Nicolson, Indian Army, Aide-de-Camp to the Queen.
Lieutenant-Colonel and Colonel Osmond Barnes, Indian Staff Corps. 
Colonel Thomas Kelly-Kenny.
Colonel Frederick Augustus le Mesurier, Colonel on the Staff (Chief Engineer), Ireland.
Colonel (with the local rank of Brigadier-General) Gerald de Courcy Morton, Commanding a Second Class District in India.
Lieutenant-Colonel and Colonel Theophilus Higginson, Indian Staff Corps.
Lieutenant-Colonel and Colonel George Swinley, Royal (late Bengal) Artillery, Colonel on the Staff, Bengal.
Colonel William Salmond, Deputy Inspector-General of Fortifications at Headquarters.
Lieutenant-Colonel and Colonel Henry Hallam Parr  The Prince Albert's (Somersetshire Light Infantry), Aide-de-Camp to the Queen.
Lieutenant-Colonel and Brevet Colonel Mark Sever Bell  Royal Engineers, Aide-de-Camp to the Queen.
Lieutenant-Colonel and Colonel James Henry Gordon  Indian Staff Corps.
Lieutenant-Colonel and Brevet Colonel Robert MacGregor Stewart, Aide-de-Camp to the Queen, Chief Instructor School of Gunnery.
Lieutenant-Colonel and Colonel Reginald William Dalgety, the York and Lancaster Regiment.
Colonel James Tierney Skinner  Army Service Corps, Assistant Adjutant-General (for Supply Reserves) Woolwich Dockyard.
Colonel Charles James Bromhead, Regimental District.
Lieutenant-Colonel and Colonel John Baillie Ballantyne Dickson.
Major and Colonel Frederick George Slade, Royal Artillery.
Lieutenant-Colonel and Brevet Colonel John Palmer Brabazon, 4th Hussars, Aide-de-Camp to the Queen.
Lieutenant-Colonel and Brevet Colonel Reginald Garnett, Aide-de-Camp to the Queen.
Lieutenant-Colonel Harrison Ross Lewin Morgan, Royal Artillery.

Civil Division
Richard Mills, Assistant Comptroller and Auditor-General, Exchequer and Audit Department.
Owen Slacke, late Capt. 10th Hussars, Divisional Commissioner in Ireland (Northern Division).
Edward Maunde Thompson, Principal Librarian and Secretary of the British Museum.
Charles George Turner, Accountant and Comptroller-General of the Inland Revenue Department.

The Imperial Order of the Crown of India
Her Highness Kempa Nanjammani Vani Vilasa Sannidhana, the Maharani of Mysore.

The Most Exalted Order of the Star of India

Knight Grand Commander (GCSI)
General Frederick Sleigh, Baron Roberts of Kandahar

Companion (CSI)
Herbert Mills Birdwood, Ordinary Member of the Council of the Governor of Bombay.
Charles James Lyall  Secretary to the Government of India in the Home Department.
Herbert Frederick Clogstoun, Commissioner of Revenue Settlement and Director of Land Records and Agriculture, Madras.
Major General Alexander Walker  Director-General of Ordnance in India.
Colonel Hurlock Galloway Pritchard, Indian Staff Corps, Accountant General in the Military Department Government of India.
Lieutenant-Colonel Howard Melliss, Indian Staff Corps.

The Most Distinguished Order of Saint Michael and Saint George

Knight Grand Cross of the Order of St Michael and St George (GCMG)
Sir George William Des Vœux  late Governor of Hong Kong.

Knight Commander of the Order of St Michael and St George (KCMG)
John Carling, Senator and Member of the Government of the Dominion of Canada.
Charles Todd  Postmaster-General and Superintendent of Telegraphs of the Colony of South Australia.
Melmoth Osborn  late Commissioner and Chief Magistrate, Zululand.
Gilbert Thomas Carter  Governor of the Colony of Lagos.
George Berkley  Past President of the Institution of Civil Engineers, for services rendered as Consulting Engineer to the Government of Natal and in connection with other Colonies.
Francis Henry Evans  for services in connection with the Colonies as Deputy Chairman of the Union Steamship Company, and otherwise.

Companion of the Order of St Michael and St George (CMG) 
Major-General Alexander Bruce Tulloch  Commandant of the Military Forces of the Colony of Victoria.
James Robert Gowan  Member of the Senate of the Dominion of Canada, and formerly Judge of the High Court of Justice, Ontario.
Collingwood Schreiber, Deputy Minister of Railways and Canals in the Dominion of Canada.
Major William George Morris, Royal Engineers, for services connected with the Geodetic Survey of the Colonies of the Cape of Good Hope and Natal.
Edward Charles Stirling  Senior Surgeon to the Adelaide Hospital and Member of the Council of the University of Adelaide, in the Colony of South Australia.
Philip Burnard Chenery Ayres, Colonial Surgeon and Inspector of Hospitals in the Colony of Hong Kong.
Francis Henry Lovell, Chief Medical Officer and President of the General Board of Health, Mauritius.
Daniel Morris  Assistant Director of the Royal Botanic Gardens, Kew, in recognition of scientific and economic services rendered to Her Majesty's Colonies.
Walter Peace, for many years Emigration Agent in London for the Colony of Natal.
Samuel Lewis, Barrister-at-Law, Unofficial Member of the Legislative Council of Sierra Leone.
Denis O'Donovan, Librarian of the Parliament of the Colony of Queensland.
Francis John Waring, C.E. Chief Resident Engineer of the Government Railway Extensions in Ceylon.
Francis John Stephens Hopwood, Assistant Secretary, Railway Department, Board of Trade, for services in connection with Colonial Fisheries and other Maritime questions.

The Most Eminent Order of the Indian Empire

Knight Commander (KCIE)
Lieutenant-General Thomas Edward Gordon  Indian Staff Corps.
Lieutenant-General Edward Charles Sparshott Williams  Royal Engineers
Sardar Asad Khan, of Sarayvan 
John Lambert  Commissioner of Police, Calcutta.

Companion (CIE)
Lieutenant-Colonel Henry Ravenshaw Thuillier, Royal Engineers, Surveyor-General of India.
Surgeon-Colonel Archibald Hamilton Hilson  late Inspector-General of Civil Hospitals in Bengal.
Capt. Alexander Campbell  Deputy Director, Royal Indian Marines.
Rao Bahadur Singh, Thakur of Masuda.
Sheikh Baha-ud-din, Nawab-i-Umb, Vizier of the Nawab of Junagarh.
Veterinary Lieutenant-Colonel James Herbert Brockencote Hallen  Inspector-General of the Civil Veterinary Department in India.
Surgeon-Lieutenant-Colonel David Douglas Cunningham  Professor of Physiology, Medical College, Calcutta.
Alexander Milne, Lieutenant-Colonel Commanding Surma Valley Light Horse Volunteers.
Bertram Sausmarez Carey, Political Officer, Chin Hills.
Dewan Bahadur Srinivasa Raghava Iyengar  Inspector-General of Registration, Madras.

References

Birthday Honours
1893 awards
1893 in Australia
1893 in Canada
1893 in India
1893 in the United Kingdom